The Somali Civil War (2009–present) is a phase of the Somali Civil War which is concentrated in southern and central Somalia. It began in late January 2009 with the conflict mainly between the forces of the Federal Government of Somalia assisted by African Union peacekeeping troops and al-Qaeda aligned al-Shabaab militants.

The conflict began in January 2009 when Ethiopian troops withdrew from Somalia, providing al-Shabaab with a power vacuum in the country in which to expand. The Islamists achieved arguably their largest success to date with the capture of Baidoa, the interim capital of the Transitional Federal Government (TFG). Al-Shabaab continued the conflict against the TFG and AMISOM throughout 2010, enjoying greater success when fighting the government forces. Local support for the organisation continued to grow, helped in part by the relatively successful law enforcement and justice system introduced in areas governed by al-Shabaab.

The Kenyan invasion of southern Somalia, Operation Linda Nchi, began in October 2011. The Kenyan government had become concerned by the growing refugee crisis and instability along its porous northern border, and intended to create a buffer-zone to prevent over-spill of the conflict into Kenyan territory. Al-Shabaab came under increasing pressure from the Kenyan intervention, which joined TFG and AMISOM troops in attacking the group. This combination challenged al-Shabaab's position in the south and drove the Islamists from the important port city of Kismayo. Somalia suffered a severe famine during 2011, further weakening al-Shabaab.

Despite the growing challenges, al-Shabaab still controls large swarths of territory in southern Somalia. It remains influential in many rural areas, and it now prioritizes guerrilla and terror attacks over territorial acquisitions. The Islamic State in Somalia (ISS) and Hizbul Islam have also carried out attacks against both factions. In 2013 Hizbul Islam renounced violence against the government, but as of 2022, ISS remains active in northern Somalia.

Background

Established in 2004 and internationally recognized, the Transitional Federal Government's (TFG) support in Somalia was waning until the United States-backed 2006 intervention by the Ethiopian military, which helped drive out the rival Islamic Courts Union (ICU) in Mogadishu and solidify the TFG's rule. Following this defeat, the ICU splintered into several different factions. Some of the more radical elements, including al-Shabaab, regrouped to continue their insurgency against the TFG and oppose the Ethiopian military's presence in Somalia. Throughout 2007 and 2008, al-Shabaab scored military victories, seizing control of key towns and ports in both central and southern Somalia. At the end of 2008, the group had captured Baidoa but not Mogadishu. By January 2009, al-Shabaab and other militias had managed to force the Ethiopian troops to withdraw from the country, leaving behind an underequipped African Union (AU) peacekeeping force. A power sharing deal ensued between an Islamist splinter group led by Sheikh Sharif Sheikh Ahmed's Alliance for the Re-liberation of Somalia Djibouti faction (ARS-D) and TFG Prime Minister Nur Hassan in Djibouti. Al-Shabaab, which had separated from the moderate Islamists of the insurgency, rejected the peace deal and continued to take territories. It was joined by Hizbul Islam, which is an amalgamation of four Islamist group including the Alliance for the Re-liberation of Somalia – Asmara faction. Another Islamist group, Ahlu Sunnah Waljama'ah, which was allied with the TFG and supported by Ethiopia, continues to attack al-Shabaab and take over towns as well although they have been effective only in the central region of Galguduud, where they ousted al-Shabaab from most of the region.

After parliament took in 275 officials from the moderate Islamist opposition, ARS leader Sheikh Ahmed was elected TFG President on 31 January 2009. Since then, the al-Shabaab radical Islamists have accused the new TFG President of accepting the secular transitional government and have continued the civil war since he arrived in Mogadishu at the presidential palace in early February 2009.

Timeline

2009–10: War begins

Al-Shabaab also vowed to fight the government. On 4 February 2009, four Islamist groups, including Hassan Dahir Aweys' Eritrean branch of the ARS merged and created the group Hisbi Islam, to oppose the new government of Sharif Sheikh Ahmed. New TFG President Sheik Sharif Sheik Ahmed arrived in Mogadishu as a president for the first time on 7 February 2009. The Al-Shabaab and other radical Islamists began firing at the new TFG president hours later. They accused the new President of accepting the secular transitional government.

On 8 February, heavy fighting broke out in southern Mogadishu. al-Shabaab leader Sheikh Mukhtar Robow (Abu Mansur) met with Sharif Ahmed for peace talks during his visit to Mogadishu, while Omar Iman rejected the president. During these negotiations, Sharif Ahmed said that he would be prepared to enforce Sharia Law in Somalia, which was the radical groups' main demand. However, Sheikh Mukhtar Robow, a former Al-Shabab spokesman, denied having talked to Sharif Ahmed and vowed to continue fighting until his demands for Sharia Law were met. Sheikh Mukhtar Robow warned Nigeria against sending peace keepers to Somalia, as al-Shabaab view the AU peace keepers as occupying forces. An offensive was launched two days later by Al-Shabaab to take the Bakool province. Government officials who had been ousted from Baidoa had been amassing troops in the city of Hudur (Xudur) and planning a major offensive to re-take Baidoa. Islamist forces attacked the province and reached the capital where they started a battle against government forces. In Galmudug, Clan militia took the town of Masagaway from Al-Shabaab, while there was also fighting in Warsheekh.

The spokesman for Al-Shabaab at the time, Sheikh Mukhtar Robow (Abu Mansur), rebuffed reports from several media outlets that a mutual agreement between him and newly elected president Sharif Ahmed was made. In his 12 February statement, he also added that he had no intention to contact the president on any matters, and that they would continue fighting against foreign troops and what he described as an "apostate" government. Al-Shabaab also vowed war against the new government. On 22 February, a double suicide bomb attack on an AU base in Mogadishu left 11 Burundian soldiers dead and another 15 wounded. Two days later, heavy fighting erupted in the city as TFG and AU forces attempted to retake the city from radical Islamist forces. The fighting lasted for two days and killed 87 people, including: 48 civilians, 15 insurgents and 6 TFG policemen. At the same time as the fighting raged in Mogadishu, Al-Shabaab forces took the town of Hudor, to the north-west, in fighting that killed another 20 people: 10 TFG soldiers, 6 insurgents and 4 civilians. On 28 February, it appeared that Hisbi Islam would sign a ceasefire with the Transitional Federal Government. However, by 1 March, it was clear that no ceasefire would be given, despite President Sharif Ahmed having agreed to proposals for a truce and having offered to accept the implementation of Sharia Law but refused to move troops from civilian areas despite the Islamists doing so. Al-Shabaab announced on 6 May that it would continue the war even if AMISOM withdrew. The Somali government, in turn, later announced an immediate blockade on airstrips and seaports under insurgent control to stop the flow of weapons reaching them.

Battle of Mogadishu and central Somalia

On 7 May, a fierce battle for control of Mogadishu started between al-Shabaab and Hizbul Islam against the TFG. Hundreds were killed and injured and tens of thousands were displaced. By 11 May, rebel forces gained the upper hand and made large gains taking over most of the capital. The rebels came close to overthrowing the government before fighting ended on 14 May, new rounds of fighting would last all through August. By 16 May, Al-Shabaab captured the strategic town of Jowhar, which connects Mogadishu with central Somalia. One of the largest battles of the war took place about 3 weeks later on 5 June when Hizbul Islam captured Wabho leaving 50 combatants killed. On 19 June, the transitional parliament speaker Sheikh Adan Mohamed Nuur Madobe asked the international community to send foreign troops to Somalia within the following 24 hours. He stated that the government's power is on the verge of being defeated by Islamist forces in the Somali capital. The Somali cabinet declared a state of emergency, and asked for help from neighboring countries which included Kenya, Djibouti, Ethiopia and Yemen. Ethiopia refused saying intervention needs an international mandate. Al-Shabaab responded by 21 June saying they would fight any foreign troops, and made threats against potential Kenyan intervention.

President Sheikh Sharif Ahmed declared a state of emergency by 22 June, as a new round of fighting in Mogadishu left 12 dead and 20 injured with hundreds more fleeing the city. The notion of Ethiopian troops intervening in the conflict caused defections by local government administration officials. Areas affected by this included Beledweyne, El-gal village, and Hiraan. The effects also caused many pro-government Islamic Courts Union officials to resign. In response, TFG forces led by general Muktar Hussein Afrah started military manoeuvers in the East side of Mogadishu. On 6 July, The Amir of al-Shabaab (Sheikh Moktar Ali Zubeyr) gave government forces an ultimatum of 5 days to hand over their weapons which was rejected. At some point, foreign aid to the government was provided in the form of security advisors. On 17 July, two of these advisors (sent by France) were captured by insurgents. The Somali government gave permission for French commandos to launch operations inside Somalia to free the 2 French nationals that were held by Al-Shabaab. France responded on 22 July by sending in warships and helicopters near the ports of Mogadishu and Marka declaring they would undertake military operations to free the two French military advisors who had been captured by insurgents. One of the hostages eventually was able to escape by August 2009, while the other was last seen in a video released in June 2010 asking for assistance. The United States also took up targeting Al-Qaeda members such as Saleh Ali Saleh Nabhan, who was killed along with 6 others in military helicopter raid on 15 September.

Al-Shabaab-Hizbul Islam conflict
The armed conflict between Hizbul Islam and al-Shabaab began due to a dispute between the faction of the Ras Kamboni Brigades led by Sheikh Ahmed "Madoobe" and al-Shabaab, over a power sharing agreement in Kisimayo. Hizbul Islam and al-Shabaab had made a power sharing agreement for the city, where the power would rotate between the two factions, with each faction controlling the city for periods of six months. However, due to clan politics al-Shabaab refused to let the power rotation take place. This led to internal problems within Hizbul Islam as its ARS-A and JABISO factions, which were aligned with al-Shabaab in Hiran and Mogadishu, refused to support the Ras Kamboni Brigades, while Anole remained neutral. It also led to a split within the Ras Kamboni Brigades, with a faction led by Hizbul Islam's deputy chairman Sheikh Hassan "Turki" refusing to back Ahmad "Madoobe" and instead siding with al-Shabaab. It was reported on 1 October that heavy fighting in Kisimayo had broken out between the two factions, al-Shabaab controlled most of the city with dozens of casualties reported by the afternoon. At least 17 more people were killed in a series of battles overnight on 5 October. Hizbul Islam claimed that they had captured foreign fighters in the battle. The battle eventually ended with a decisive victory for al-Shabaab, which expelled Madbobe's Ras Kamboni Brigade forces from the city.

Throughout 2009 November, fighting between the two factions continued as the battle lines moved into Southern Somalia, resulting in a decrease in insurgent attacks at Mogadishu targeting government forces (TFG) and their allies (AMISOM). Sheikh Ahmad Madobe's forces were ultimately overpowered by al-Shabaab and its local allies, and forced to withdraw from the Lower Jubba region and most of Southern Somalia. The merger between al-Shabaab and Sheikh Hassan Turki's branch of the Ras Kamboni Brigades occurred early in 2010 (February) with a call for other groups in Hizbul Islam to do the same. Additional battles throughout 2010 were fought between Hizbul Islam and al-Shabaab in central Somalia as fighting moved from the Hiran region to the Bay region, to Lower Shabelle. Hizbul Islam eventually was forced to surrender the Luuq District in Gedo region to al-Shabaab, after which the group announced that it would merge with al-Shabaab. From mid-December al-Shabaab fighters started taking over Hizbul Islam positions. The merge was confirmed on 20 December, when Hizbul Islam Chairman Sheikh Hassan Dahir Aweys and Sheikh Mohammad Osman Arus, the organisation's official spokesman, surrendered to al-Shabaab and disbanded the organisation.

2011–15: Government forces retake lost territory

Battle of Gashandiga
Al-Shabaab controlled roughly half the lands claimed by the Somali government at their greatest extent in 2009 July. With the help of allies, government forces slowly started to make gains that would lead to a retake of lost territory through various military operations. An offensive on 20 February 2011 was dubbed by AU Representative Wafula Wamunyinyi as the "Battle of Gashandiga." This offensive involved AMISOM troops destroying a large complex of al-Shabaab trenches, killing six al-Shabaab commanders in Mogadishu. Towards the end of February, disturbances moved into Mogadishu again in the form of one suicide attack and heavy shelling as al-Shabaab fighters attempted to re-take lost territory. This push resulted in the deaths of at least 47 people, rebels displayed one wounded and five dead Burundian AMISOM soldiers. Another offensive was opened up between 26 February and 28 February by TFG troops with support of Ethiopian soldiers in Bula Hawo (southern Somalia), resulting in 33 deaths.

By 5 March, AMISOM and TFG forces claimed to control seven of the city's districts, while six were contested and three were controlled by anti-government forces. Al-Shabaab responded to the government offensive by putting up roadblocks to prevent the movement of goods from the seaport. This adversely affected both sides of the conflict, as the TFG controlled the port and its profits. At the same time though, places such as Bakaara Market were controlled by the insurgents where many of the goods were bound to be sold. It was also reported by this time that up to 53 AMISOM may have died in the clashes, which included 43 Burundian and 10 Ugandans. An additional 1,000 peacekeepers to assist in the TFG's renewed offensive against al-Shabaab were brought in, and by 16 March AMISOM had a force of nearly 9,000.

Defeat of Al-Shabaab in Mogadishu

The 2010–11 battle of Mogadishu began when al-Shabaab militants launched an offensive to capture the city. The battle soon swung in favor of government forces, who were able to drive the militant group out by 11 October 2011. The complete capture of the city took place on 7 September 2012, when the Transitional Federal Government's troops and their AMISOM allies managed to secure the city. Around the same time witnesses reported Al-Shabaab vehicles abandoning their bases in the capital for the south-central city of Baidoa. The group's spokesman Sheikh Ali Mohamud Rage described the exodus as a tactical retreat, and vowed to continue the insurgency against the national government. Observers have suggested that the pullout may have been caused in part by internal ideological rifts in the rebel organization. The city was by no means safe after al-Shabaab withdrew as the militant group continued hit and run tactics in the Northern part of the city. Suicide bombs continued to be an occurrence lasting into 2020 (see below).

Fighting in Puntland
On 2 to 3 September, fighting was reported in Puntland that resulted in the deaths of up to 60 people, including 8 Puntland soldiers and 40 Al-Shabaab militants, with Insurgents being repelled. Al-Shabaab claimed on 7 September that they have captured 2 Kenyan troops who were on a surveillance mission near the Kenyan-Somali Border. Puntland forces captured 18 members of Al-Shabaab in counter-terrorism operations on 8 September.

Battle of Elwaq & Kismayo offensive

Al-Shabaab attacked the southern town of Elwaq on 10 September 2011, resulting in the deaths of 12 insurgents and soldiers. The next day, Somali troops fought back, retaking the town after militants fled on captured technicals. The bodies of 30 militants were later found, some of them children. Conversely, Al-Shabaab claimed they killed around 70 government aligned troops and captured 10 technicals.

The Burundian military lost 51 soldiers in October, causing anger among Burundians, who believe that their country is sacrificing too much. Many Burundians have urged other AU members to contribute troops to the Somalia mission.  Nigeria, Djibouti, and Guinea have indicated sending troops, but all have yet to contribute.

On 4 September 2012 the Kenyan Navy shelled Kismayo. This was part of an AU offensive to capture the city from al-Shabab fighters. The harbour was shelled two times and the airport three times. According to a UN report the export of charcoal through Kismayo is a major source of income for al-Shabab.

On 28 September 2012, the Somali National Army assisted by AMISOM troops and Ras Kamboni militia launched an assault on Kismayo, Al-Shabaab's last major stronghold. The allied forces reportedly managed to re-capture much of the city from the insurgents.

Operation Indian Ocean & Jubba Corridor

In August 2014, the Somali government-led Operation Indian Ocean was launched to clean up the remaining insurgent-held pockets in the countryside. On 1 September 2014, a U.S. drone strike carried out as part of the broader mission killed Al-Shabaab leader Moktar Ali Zubeyr. U.S. authorities hailed the raid as a major symbolic and operational loss for Al-Shabaab, and the Somali government offered a 45-day amnesty to all moderate members of the militant group. Political analysts also suggested that the insurgent commander's death will likely lead to Al-Shabaab's fragmentation and eventual dissolution.

At the end of the month of July 2015, AMISOM and the Somali National Army regained many villages and major towns of Baardhere and Dinsoor.

2016: Battle of El Adde and resurgence of Al Shabaab
On 15 January 2016, Al Shabaab attacked a Kenyan-run AMISOM base in El Adde Somalia, overrunning the compound and killing approximately 185 soldiers. Al Shabaab then regained the important town of Marka, 45 km from the capital, and the port of Gard in Puntland region (March 2016). The resurgence of Al Shabaab could entail serious implications for the humanitarian sector.

On 5 March 2016, U.S. airstrikes carried out by aircraft and unmanned drones killed more than 150 Al-Shabaab terrorists at a terrorist training camp called "Camp Raso", located about 120 miles north of Mogadishu as they were completing "training for a large-scale attack" according to a Pentagon spokesman. The camp had been under surveillance for some time before the strike. In the early hours of 9 March 2016, U.S. special forces and Somali national army special forces killed between 1 and 15 Al-Shabaab terrorists in a heliborne-attack on the Al-Shabaab-controlled town of Awdhegele, as well as capturing an undisclosed number of high-value Al-Shabaab figures the militants were training for a major operation against coalition forces.

On 11/12 April 2016, two U.S. airstrikes on Al-Shabaab targets in the town of Kismayo killed about a dozen suspected militants who posed a "imminent threat" to American troops in the country. As of May 2016, roughly 50 U.S. special operations troops operate at undisclosed locations across southern Somalia, with their headquarters at the airport in Mogadishu; advising and assisting, Kenyan, Somali and Ugandan forces in their fight against Al-Shabaab. Also in that month, U.S. personnel helped those forces plan an operation against illegal checkpoints.

On 12 May 2016, a small group of U.S. military advisers accompanied some Ugandan soldiers during a raid on an illegal taxation checkpoint just west of Mogadishu, when the Ugandans came under fire from 15 to 20 al Shabaab militants, the U.S. commander on the ground called in a "defensive" airstrike, killing five militants and wounding two more. Two days previously, the U.S. provided helicopters and advise and assist in support of a Somali military mission against a group of al Shabaab militants, which one defense official said was also defensive because they had intelligence that the al Shabaab fighters were planning an attack on the AMISOM installation nearby. No word on how many al Shabaab were killed or wounded in that operation. On 13 May, a U.S. strike targeted nine al-Shabab militants, three of them were allegedly killed.

On the night of 31 May 2016, two senior Al-Shabaab operatives; Mohamud Dulyadeyn, the plotter behind the Garissa University attack in April 2015 and Maalim Daud, head of Al-Shabaab's intelligence hit squads and another 16 members from Al-Shabaab were killed by the Somali National Army and anti-terror partners. Defense Department spokeswoman Lt. Col. Michelle L. Baldanza told CNN "U.S. forces supported this Somali-led operation in an advise-and-assist role,".

On 1 June 2016, Al Shabaab militants attacked with a car bomb on the gate of Ambassador Hotel in Mogadishu, Somalia. At least 15 people have been killed in the attack, among 10 civilian pedestrians and two members of parliament near the gate. Also that day, the Pentagon announced that it had conducted an airstrike that killed a senior Al-Shabaab leader in Somalia on 27 May. On 3 August 2016, a contingent of elite American troops acting as military advisers assisted Somali commandos in an assault on an al-Shabaab checkpoint in Saakow, as the Somali-led force approached the checkpoint the militants opened fire, a gun battle ensued that resulted in 3 militants killed.

On 29 September 2016, a Somali regional government demanded an explanation from the United States after an airstrike killed 22 civilians and other soldiers instead of the targeted al-Shabab militants in Galmudug. The Military Times also reported that on 26 September a bomb-manufacturing network linked al-Shabaab attacked a small team of U.S. and Somali troops, who were conducting an operation near Kismayo, with small-arms fire. A Pentagon spokesman said the U.S. military "conducted a self-defense strike to neutralize the threat and in doing so killed nine enemy fighters." Also on 28 September, near the town of Galkayo, a Somali army unit conducting counterterrorism operations nearby, when the Somali soldiers came under fire from al-Shabab militants. The Somali soldiers engaged them, then broke contact and rejoined with their nearby American advisers and soon afterwards the militants "began to maneuver in an offensive manner" so the U.S. conducted a self-defense airstrike, killing 4 militants.

2017: American involvement expanded

In late March 2017, President Donald Trump signed off a new strategy granting AFRICOM more freedom in counterterrorist operations.

Stars and Stripes reported that in addition to the stepping-up of airstrikes, US special forces on the frontlines with Somali forces have also been increased, conventional US troops give lessons in building defense institutions, with added support from other nations.

CNN reported that General Thomas Waldhauser, commander of AFRICOM, told reporters in April that the US seeks to help Somali security forces gain the ability to provide for their own security by 2021.

Fox News reported that they targeting what Pentagon spokesperson Captain Jeff Davis said was a "group of people" associated with attacks on Mogadishu. The New York Times reported that Defence Department officials said that Somali forces were to have led the operation, with the SEALs hanging back in an advise, assist and accompany role, however Brig.Gen. David J. Furness, the commander of the military's task force for the Horn of Africa, said that American and Somali forces were traveling together in a single group. Whilst approaching the complex, the militants opened fire and the mission was aborted, Senior chief petty officer Kyle Milliken was killed, 2 other SEALs and an interpreter were wounded. Captain Jeff Davis said that the mission "resulted in the death of three Shabaab operatives including Moalin Osman Abdi Badil," the group quickly returned to the aircraft that had taken it to the area and was exfilled. Davis described Badil as an al-Shabaab leader responsible for gathering information on troop movements in order to support attacks on Somali and African Union forces and that he had been linked to the death of several soldiers and at least one civilian.

CNN reported that on 11 June 2017, that a US air strike killed 8 al-Shabaab militants in Sakow, the president of Somalia said that "This was a successful strike which destroyed a key Al-Shabaab command and supply hub," and that "This will ultimately disrupt the enemy's ability to conduct new attacks within Somalia." CNN reported that on 23 July 2017, The US carried out a targeted airstrike an al-Shabaab regional commander in Banadir. Fox News reported that on 30 July 2017, a US strike near Tortoroow in southern Somalia which was coordinated with regional partners as a direct response to al-Shabaab's actions which included attacks on Somali forces, killed Ali Jabal, who was considered a senior al-Shabaab terrorist and was responsible for leading forces operating in the Mogadishu and Banadiir area, including planning and carrying out attacks in Mogadishu.

ABC reported that on 10 August 2017, airstrikes conducted by drones in Banaadir in a joint operation against al-Shabaab fighters, killing a high-level al-Shabaab leader. The airstrikes marked the fourth offensive airstrike against al-Shabaab since the new authorisation in March. CNN reported that on 17 August 2017, the US conducted a "self defense" drone strike in Jilib after a joint US-Somali force, consisting of Somali troops and US advisors, came under direct attack by al-Shabaab militants and a firefight ensued, 7 militants were killed.

Military.com reported that on 3 November 2017, that a US drone conducted two airstrikes against Islamic State in Somalia, at least six missiles were used which struck in Buqa, 37 miles north of Qandala, AFRICOM said in a statement that "several terrorists" were killed and that the strikes were carried out in coordination with Somalia's government; marking the first time the US has conducted airstrikes against ISS terrorists in Somalia. CNN reported that US drone aircraft conducted 5 strikes between 9 and 12 November against al-Shabaab and ISS linked militants, killing 36 al-Shabaab and 4 ISS terrorists. One of the strikes killed an al-Shabaab terrorist who had attacked a joint US-Somali military convoy in Gaduud. CNN reported that a US airstrike on a camp 125 miles northwest of Mogadishu killed more than 100 al-Shabaab militants; the US now estimates there are between 3,000 and 6,000 al-Shabaab fighters and less than 250 ISIS operatives in Somalia Military Times reported that on 14 November, a US drone strike roughly 60 miles northwest of Mogadishu killed several al-Shabaab militants. CNN reported that on 24 December, a U.S. airstrike in southern Somalia killed 13 al-Shabaab terrorists.

2018–present: Ongoing guerrilla warfare

2019
By 2019, the United States was heavily involved in the war, using airstrikes. On 14 April, AFRICOM killed Abdulhakim Dhuqub, a high-ranking ISIS-Somalia official, near Xiriiro, Bari Region. On 25 October, a U.S. airstrike targeted Islamic militants near Ameyra, south of Bosaso, which killed three of their leaders.

On 12 July, A car bombing and gun attack killed at least 26 people, including two prominent journalists and nine foreigners, in Kismayo, Lower Juba. On 22 July, a bombing killed 17 people and injured 28 others in Mogadishu. On 24 July, a suicide bomber detonated inside the office of the Mayor of Mogadishu, killing six government officials; mayor Abdirahman Abdi Osman was hospitalised in Doha, Qatar before succumbing to his injuries on 1 August.

On 26 August, the Somali Army captured Burweryn from al-Shabaab.

On 28 December, an al-Shabaab suicide truck bomber killed at least 85 people at a police checkpoint in Mogadishu.

2020
On 5 January, al-Shabaab militants attacked the airstrip of the military base Camp Simba, which is used by US and Kenyan forces. One US serviceman and two contractors were killed; two US servicemen were wounded and four militants were also killed in the gunfight.

On 19 March, the Somali Army captured Jamale town from al-Shabaab, with support from the US military.

On 31 May, the Somali military shot dead approximately 18 al-Shabaab militants and injured several others in an operation conducted in the southern Lower Shabelle region.

2021
On 7 February, a roadside bomb exploded in Dusmareb, Galguduud, killing 12 agents working for the National Intelligence and Security Agency. The local head of the intelligence agency, Abdirashid Abdunur, was among those killed.

On 14 February, al-Shabaab killed two SNA soldiers in Awdheegle district in Lower Shabelle.

On 2 March, al-Shabaab publicly killed five people by firing squad for allegedly spying for the United States and Somali intelligence agencies in Jilib, Middle Juba. Hundreds of people reportedly gathered to watch the killings.

On 5 March, a suicide car bomber killed at least 20 people outside a restaurant in Mogadishu.

On 3 April, al-Shabaab militants attacked two SNA bases near Mogadishu resulting in several hours of fighting. The SNA said they killed 77 al-Shabaab militants. Al-Shabaab said they killed 47 SNA troops in the attack. On the same day, a suicide bomber detonated their suicide vest targeting civilians outside a teashop in Mogadishu. The attack left 6 people dead, including the perpetrator.

On 10 April, a suicide bomber tried to kill a regional governor in Baidoa. The governor escaped, but 3 others were killed in the attack, including two of his bodyguards.

On 14 April, 17 civilians were killed when an IED exploded as a minibus drove over it whilst travelling on the Mogadishu-Jowhar road.

From 25 April - 6 May, hundreds of Somali soldiers mutinied.

On 12 June, a Somali policeman was killed and two others were wounded when ISIS operatives detonated an IED at a police checkpoint in the City of Afgooye, 20 km northwest of Mogadishu.

On 15 June, at least 15 Somali Army recruits were killed when an al-Shabaab suicide bomber blew himself up at a Somali Army training camp in Mogadishu.

On 27 June, Puntland executed 21 al-Shabaab prisoners in the largest single execution of al-Shabaab fighters in Somalia.

On 10 July, nine people were killed after a car bomb exploded in Mogadishu. Al-Shabaab later claimed responsibility.

On 24 September, two Somali policemen were shot dead by ISS operatives in Mogadishu.

On 25 September, at least eight people were killed and six others were wounded in a suicide bombing in Mogadishu.

On 25 November, an al-Shabaab suicide bomber in a sport utility vehicle killed eight people in Mogadishu.

On 5 December, al-Shabaab claimed responsibility a bomb blast at a restaurant in Awdhegle in southern Somalia. At least five people including civilians were killed and more than six others wounded in the attack.

2022 

On 12 January, al-Shabaab claimed responsibility for a car bomb that killed eight people and wounded another nine outside the Mogadishu International Airport, a facility which hosts the United States Embassy and other diplomatic offices. The group said via a radio address that a convoy of "white officials" had been the target of the bombing.

On 19 February, a suicide bombing in a restaurant in the city of Beledweyne killed 14 people. Al-Shabaab later claimed responsibility.

On 23 March, al-Shabaab carried out attacks in Mogadishu and Beledweyne. Politicians Amina Mohamed Abdi and Hassan Dhuhul were among killed.

On 3 May, at least 30 soldiers of the African Union, including 10 Burundian soldiers, were killed after al-Shabaab militants attacked an African Union military base near the village of Ceel Baraf, about 100 miles north of Mogadishu. At least 20 Al-Shabaab fighters were reportedly killed.

In late July, al-Shabaab launched an invasion of Ethiopia with at least 1,500 militants.

On 19 August, al-Shabaab militants attacked a hotel in Mogadishu, killing at least 21 people and wounding over 100. In response to the terror attack, President Hassan Sheikh Mohamud declared "total war" against al-Shabaab. Cooperating with United States forces (who contributed airstrikes against al-Shabaab, one of which killed 27 al-Shabaab militants with no civilian casualties reported), an offensive operation began to weaken al-Shabaab's forces in the Hiran region. The offensive operations had been described as the "largest combined Somali and ATMIS offensive operation in five years."

2023 

On 16 January, Somali army captured Harardhere and Galcad from Al-Shabaab.

Foreign involvement

African Union Mission in Somalia (AMISOM)

The African Union has deployed more than 16,000 soldiers to Somalia, mandated to support transitional governmental structures, implement a national security plan, train the Somali security forces, and assist in creating a secure environment for the delivery of humanitarian aid. As part of its duties, AMISOM also supports the Transitional Federal Government's forces in their battle against Al-Shabaab militants.

AMISOM was created by the African Union's Peace and Security Council on 19 January 2007 with an initial six-month mandate. On 21 February 2007 the United Nations Security Council approved the mission's mandate. Subsequent six-monthly renewals of AMISOM's mandate by the African Union Peace and Security Council have also been authorised by the United Nations Security Council.

AMISOM's UN mandate was extended for a further six months in August 2008 by UNSCR 1831. The AMISOM's mandate has been extended each period that it has been up for review. It is now set to be reviewed again on 16 January 2013.

On 12 November 2013, the UN Security Council adopted SC Resolution 2124 (2013) extending AMISOM's mandate from 28 February 2014 to 31 October 2014. Acting upon the force's request, the resolution also increases AMISOM's maximum authorized strength from 17,731 to 22,126 troops.

The force, which has been reportedly engaged in fighting in Mogadishu and throughout the country, has reportedly suffered significant casualties during their mission, although no precise figures have been issued by the contributing countries.

United States and United Nations

The United National Development Program for Somalia spends about $50 million each year, though these funds are not related to military aid. Instead these programs, such as Employment Generation for Early Recovery (EGER). As of October 2010, the U.S. State Department noted the United States directly obligated over $229 million to support AMISOM, and paid for other UN assistance for the mission indirectly through its obligations to the international body.

In January 2013, the U.S. announced that it was set to exchange diplomatic notes with the new central government of Somalia, re-establishing official ties with the country for the first time in 20 years. According to the Department of State, the decision was made in recognition of the significant progress that the Somali authorities had achieved on both the political and war fronts. The move is expected to grant the Somali government access to new sources of development funds from American agencies as well as international bodies like the International Monetary Fund and World Bank, thereby facilitating the ongoing reconstruction process. In addition to diplomatic ties; roughly 50 U.S. special operations troops operate at undisclosed locations across southern Somalia advising and assisting, Kenyan, Somali and Ugandan forces in their fight against Al-Shabaab.

At the behest of the Somali and American federal governments, among other international actors, the United Nations Security Council unanimously approved United Nations Security Council Resolution 2093 during its 6 March 2013 meeting to suspend the 21-year arms embargo on Somalia. The endorsement officially lifts the purchase ban on light weapons for a provisional period of one year, but retains certain restrictions on the procurement of heavy arms such as surface-to-air missiles, howitzers and cannons. On 9 April 2013, the U.S. government likewise approved the provision of defense articles and services by the American authorities to the Somali Federal Government. At the request of the Somali authorities and AMISOM, the U.S. military in late 2013 also established a small team of advisers in Mogadishu to provide consultative and planning support to the allied forces.

The United Kingdom is also involved in combating Islamist terrorists in Somalia, since 2009, members of the Special Air Service and the Special Reconnaissance Regiment have been deployed to Camp Lemonnier to conduct counter-terrorist operations against Islamist terrorists in Somalia; they have carrying out surveillance missions of Britons believed to be travelling to Somalia for terrorist training and they are also working with US counterparts observing and "targeting" local terror suspects. They have also been carrying out a similar role in Yemen. In May 2016, it was reported that 70 UK military personnel have arrived in Somalia to counter Al-Shabaab as part of a UN peacekeeping mission; 10 soldiers will offer medical, engineering and logistical support to AMISOM. Personnel will also be sent to South Sudan to carry out a similar role.

On 16 October 2016, the New York Times reported that American officials said the White House had quietly broadened the president's authority for the use of force in Somalia by allowing airstrikes to protect American and African troops as they combat fighters from al-Shabaab. About 200 to 300 American Special Operations troops work with soldiers from Somalia and other African nations like Kenya and Uganda to carry out more than a half-dozen raids per month, according to senior American military officials. The operations are a combination of ground raids and drone strikes. SEAL Team 6 has been heavily involved in many of these operations. American military officials said once ground operations are complete, American troops working with Somali forces often interrogate prisoners at temporary screening facilities, including one in Puntland, before the detainees are transferred to more permanent Somali-run prisons. The Pentagon has only acknowledged a small fraction of these operations, announcing 13 ground raids and airstrikes so far in 2016 (3 of which took place in September) — up from 5 in 2015; according to data compiled by New America (a Washington Think tank) the strikes have killed about 25 civilians and 200 people suspected of being militants. At a former Russian fighter jet base in Baledogle, U.S. Marines and private contractors are working to build up a Somali military unit designed to combat Al-Shabaab throughout the country.

On 30 March 2017, CNN reported that US President Donald Trump signed off a decision by the White House which approved a new strategy granting AFRICOM the authority to step up counterterrorism strikes in Somalia; under the new strategy, the US military will now be able to conduct precision airstrikes in support of the Somalia National Army and AMISOM forces. The new authorization designates some regions of Somalia an "area of active hostilities," freeing counterterrorism strikes there from restrictions governing other strikes outside the areas; an official said that the designated areas will not include Mogadishu and Puntland. Captain Jeff Davis, a Pentagon Spokesman said that "The additional support provided by this authority will help deny al-Shabaab safe havens from which it could attack US citizens or US interests in the region." Another official said that the legal basis for the new authority is the 2001 AUMF. In mid-April 2017, it was reported that 40 soldiers from the 101st Airborne Division were deployed to Somalia on 2 April 2017 to improve the capabilities of the Somalia Army in combating Islamist militants. AFRICOM stated that the troops will focus on bolstering the Somali army's logistics capabilities; an AFRICOM spokesman said that "This mission is not associated with teaching counterextremism tactics" and that the Somali government requested the training.

On 16 June 2020, Human Rights Watch revealed the inconsistency in investigation by the US authorities in a 2 February airstrike, which killed one woman. And a 10 March attack that killed five men, including a child.

President Donald Trump ordered the Department of Defense to remove the majority of the 700 U.S. military troops in Somalia from the country in December 2020. On May 16, 2022, it was announced that President Joe Biden was reversing President Trump's withdrawal and sending up to 450 ground troops back into Somalia.

Ethiopia

2009

On 16 February, Somali MP Mohamud Sayid Adan, former Mogadishu mayor Mohamed Omar Habeeb and local police officer Hassan Dhicisow, were arrested by Ethiopian forces in the town of Dolow in Gedo region.

On 28 May, 2 Ethiopian soldiers, 1 Ethiopian civilian, 2 Somali soldiers, 4 Somali civilians (working for the government) and 4 Somali insurgents were killed when insurgents attacked a convoy carrying Omar Hashi Aden, who was returning from his visit to Ethiopia.

On 31 May, Ethiopian forces launched search and seizure operations in Hiraan, in Kalaberyr village, near Beledweyn.

On 12 June, Ethiopian forces with several battle wagons entered in Balanbal town in Galgudud and set up military bases.

On 14 June, the Ethiopian military said it had come to fight foreign mujahedin which the military described as "foreign enemies of Ethiopia and Somalia" and launched operations to search for them in Balanbal town which they control. Sheik Hassan Ya'qub Ali, head of the information affairs for Islamic administration in Kisimayo warned the Ethiopians that "there is no candy and dates to eat from here in Somalia. But the men who chased you forcibly from the country are here in Somalia."

The suicide bombing on 18 June targeted a meeting between TFG and Ethiopian commanders.

On 19 June, Ethiopian forces entered Bakool and reached Elberde town. They withdrew after holding talks with local clan elders.

22 June, Ethiopian forces started launching search and seizure operations in Kala-beyrka intersection in Hiran region.

The Ethiopian government then announced it would not intervene without an international mandate.

30 June, Ethiopian forces entered El-gal and Ilka'adde villages which are less than 20 km north of regional capital Beledweyn. Reports from Kala-beyrka intersection say that more extra troops from Ethiopia crossed from the border.

4 July, Ethiopians withdrew from their bases in Banabal town in Galgudug.

18 July, Ethiopian forces vacated their bases in Yed Village in insurgent-controlled Bakool region.

During the weekend of 29–30 August, Ethiopian forces advanced to Beledweyne, supporting a government offensive on the insurgent part of, Beledweyne. They withdrew on 31 August. The assault on Beledweyne by government forces came as the TFG governor of Hiraan (belonging to Sharif Ahmed's ARS-Djibouti faction), Sheikh Abdirahman Ibrahim Ma'ow, which controls the other part of Beledweyne, withdrew his administration's support for the TFG.

2010
19 March, Mohammed wali Odowa, spokesman of Hizbul Islam's Hiraan administration in Beledweyne, threatened that Hizbul Islam forces would attack any Ethiopian forces which entered Hizbul Islam controlled territories in Hiraan.

20 May, Ethiopian forces seized control of the previously al-Shabaab held towns of Yeed and Elbarde, in Bakool region. Al-Shabaab had captured Elbarde from the TFG on 20 April.

On 18 July, Ethiopian forces withdrew from all their bases in Hiraan and Bakool regions. Ethiopian forces had held these territories for two months, during which they clashed several times with al-Shabaab forces which control most of Hiraan. Before they withdrew they released over 20 lorries which used to travel between the South and Central regions of Somalia.

On 1 August, 27,000 Ethiopian troops entered Somalia through the border town of Dolo, where 6,000 Ethiopian forces are based. They advanced deep into Gedo region in the direction of the towns of Beledehawa and Elwak, accompanied by militia of pro-Ethiopian, Somali fraction leaders. In Hiraan, Ethiopian forces which entered along with TFG-forces exchanged fire with al-Shabaab militants and advanced until the Kalaber junction, near Beledweyne. The Ethiopian troops then withdrew to Ferfer.

On 29 August, there was a second Ethiopian incursion. A large number of Ethiopian forces in military vehicles, accompanied by highly trained TFG forces, entered several villages in al-Shabaab controlled Hiraan region. This came at a time when al-Shabaab militants regularly ventured near the border. Hussein Abdallah, an ASWJ loyalist claimed that the movements were a preliminary action to signal that Ethiopian authorities are able of weakening the Islamist insurgents, to al-Shabaab's leadership.

On 1 September, Ethiopian forces moved deeper into Gedo region, via Dolow, entering the TFG-held village of Yeed. TFG officials in the region reported they were planning to capture the entire Bay and Bakool regions from al-Shabaab.

On 30 December, TFG forces clashed with Ethiopian troops in the Jawil district, near Beledweyne, after Ethiopian forces took a TFG soldier into custody. One TFG soldier and one civilian were injured in the clashes.

2011
3 January, Ahlu Sunna Waljamaa official Sheikh Abdi Badel Sheikh Abdullahi, complained about Ethiopian forces in the town of Dolo, in Gedo region. The town is controlled by 300 ASWJ and TFG forces, but it is also home to several Ethiopian military bases. Ethiopian forces had called on ASWJ fighters in the district to lay down their arms. According to a TFG official, three Ethiopian commanders had then come to the town of Dolo and ordered TFG forces to disarm. Ethiopian troops then disarmed a number of TFG and ASWJ forces. Sheikh Abdullahi alleged that Ethiopian forces were doing this because they were outraged by ASWJ's military capability.

On 19 November, eyewitness reported large number of Ethiopian troops crossing into Somalia. Ethiopian authorities denied this.

After a multinational conference held on 25 November in Addis Ababa, IGAD announced that the Ethiopian government had agreed to support the allied forces' campaign against Al-Shabaab.

On 31 December 2011, the Transitional Federal Government soldiers and around 3,000 allied Ethiopian army troops attacked Beledweyne in the early morning, capturing it after hours of fighting. They later took control of Baidoa, among other areas.

2012
On 22 October 2012, the Spokesman of African Union Mission to Somalia (AMISOM) Col. Ali Aden Humed speaking to journalists in Mogadishu on Saturday said that Ethiopian forces present in parts of the regions of Somalia will soon pull out from the country.
The spokesman said AMISOM troops will take over the areas where Ethiopian forces are holding at the moment. "The plan by AMISOM is to take over the positions held by Ethiopian forces in parts of the regions of the country, Ethiopian troops will soon retreat back to their position along Somalia border" said Col. Ali Aden Humed.

2013
In 2013, Ethiopian Foreign Minister Tedros Adhanom announced that Ethiopian troops were pulling out of Baidoa as the situation on the ground was relatively stable and the Somali military and AMISOM forces were now able to assume security duties. The withdrawal was well planned and coordinated. Adhanom added that a pullout could have occurred twelve months earlier, but the allied forces were at the time unprepared to take over, so the move was postponed. Additionally, he asserted that Eritrea was attempting to destabilize Somalia and environs, and that the international community should take the situation seriously since Eritrea was also still allegedly supporting Al-Shabaab. Following the Westgate shooting in Nairobi by Al Shabaab operatives, the Ethiopian government halted its plans to withdraw completely out of Somalia. In November 2013, the Ethiopian government announced that it would integrate its troops that are deployed in Somalia into the AMISOM multinational force. Somalia's Foreign Minister Fowzia Haji Yussuf welcomed the decision, stating that the move would galvanize AMISOM's campaign against the insurgent group. She also emphasized the importance of collaboration between Somalia and Ethiopia. The Ethiopian authorities' announcement came a month after a failed October bombing attempt by Al-Shabaab in the Ethiopian capital of Addis Ababa, and a week after Ethiopia received a renewed terrorism threat from the insurgent group. According to Ethiopian Ministry of Foreign Affairs spokesperson Ambassador Dina Mufti, the Ethiopian military's decision to join AMISOM is intended to render the peacekeeping operation more secure. Analysts also suggested that the move was primarily motivated by financial considerations, with the Ethiopian forces' operational costs now slated to be under AMISOM's allowance budget. It is believed that the Ethiopian military's long experience in Somali territory, its equipment such as helicopters, and the potential for closer coordination will help the allied forces advance their territorial gains. On the other hand, there is a certain amount of unease following Ethiopia's entry into AMISOM given local animosity originating from Ethiopia's heavy handed intervention in 2006. There are also fears that Al Shabaab could use Somali animosity towards Ethiopia as a rallying cry and to recruit more members. It is also believed that some Ethiopian troops in Somalia operate independently from AMISOM.

2014

In December 2014, the Ethiopian government offered to replace the last AMISOM contingent from Sierra Leone with fresh Ethiopian military reinforcements.

2015–2018
In 2015, the African Union Mission in Somalia (AMISOM), announced a new military operation against Al Shabaab, for removing it in the last strong holds in Somalia. The operation involved Ethiopian National Defence and Kenya Defence Forces too.

At the end of the month of July 2015, AMISOM and Somalia National Army regained many villages and major towns of Baardhere and Dinsoor.

On 15 December 2018, there were demonstrations in the city of Baidoa in Somalia by supporters of Mukhtar Robow, a presidency candidate, who was arrested two days before by government forces and transferred to Mogadishu. Rowbow is a former member of al-Shabab. African Union Mission in Somalia (AMISOM) announced in a statement that its forces did not assist in Rowbow's arrest and his transfer to Mogadishu.

2020
On 4 May 2020, an East African Express Airways Embraer EMB 120 Brasilia airliner on an air charter flight delivering COVID-19 pandemic relief supplies crashed on approach to Berdale, Somalia, killing all 2 crew and 4 non-revenue passengers on board. On 10 May, a leaked AMISOM report alleged that ground troops of the Ethiopian National Defense Force operating outside AMISOM authority had shot the aircraft down, mistakenly believing it was undertaking a suicide attack. This allegation ignited renewed controversy over unauthorized Ethiopian incursions into Somalia to fight Al-Shabaab. Ethiopian, Kenyan and Somali authorities have initiated a joint investigation of the accident.

2021

Tigray People's Liberation Front
In August 2021, two members of the Tigray People's Liberation Front took control of the town of Baardhere in the Meda region.

Kenya

Recruitment from Kenya
According to press reports, Somali and Kenyan government officials have recruited and trained Somali refugees in Kenya and Kenyan nationals who are ethnic Somalis to fight insurgents in Somalia. However, the Somali chief of military staff and spokesmen from the Kenyan government have denied this.

2010 Kenya-Al-Shabaab border clash

On 20 July 2010 border clashes between Kenya and Al-Shabaab insurgents occurred when gunmen from the militia attacked a Kenyan border patrol along the border area in Liboi, Lagdera. There was a subsequent fierce exchange of fire between the two sides leading to the deaths of 2 militia and the wounding of one Kenyan officer. Hundreds of security personnel were later deployed to the border following the clash and because of continued fighting between two militia groups in the neighbouring town of Dobley, Somalia. Al-Shabaab had previously claimed responsibility for a deadly suicide bombing in Uganda in July.

Operation Linda Nchi
 
In October 2011, the Kenya Defence Forces began Operation Linda Nchi against Al-Shabaab in southern Somalia. The mission was officially led by the Somali armed forces, with the Kenyan armed forces providing supporting role. In early June 2012, Kenyan forces were formally integrated into AMISOM.

Camp Simba attack

On 5 January 2020, Al-Shabaab militants launched an attack at on Camp Simba at Manda Air Strip used by Kenyan and U.S. troops in Lamu County, Kenya, the attack was repelled, leaving 3 American nationals killed; 1 serviceman and two contractors. Four militants died in the attack and five were arrested. Moreover, six aircraft and land vehicles were destroyed or damaged at the airstrip. Some of the airframes lost included a De Havilland Canada Dash 8 and two helicopters.

Piracy

Government officials from the Galmudug administration in the north-central Hobyo district also reportedly attempted to use pirate gangs as a bulwark against Islamist insurgents from southern Somalia's conflict zones. Other pirates are alleged to have reached agreements of their own with the Islamist groups, although a senior commander from the Hizbul Islam militia vowed to eradicate piracy by imposing sharia law when his group briefly took control of Harardhere in May 2010 and drove out the local pirates.

See also

List of drone strikes in Somalia
List of wars: 2003–present

References

 

2000s in Somalia
2010s in Somalia
2020s in Somalia
2000s conflicts
2010s conflicts
2020s conflicts
Wars involving Burundi
Wars involving Djibouti
Wars involving Ethiopia
Wars involving France
Wars involving Guinea
Wars involving Kenya
Wars involving Somalia
Wars involving Uganda
Wars involving the United States